Leptotes mogyensis is a species of orchid endemic to southeastern Brazil.

References

External links 

mogyensis
Endemic orchids of Brazil